Mesua is a genus of flowering plants in the family Calophyllaceae, native to tropical southern Asia. Common names include ironwood (shared with many other plants) and rose chestnut.

They are evergreen shrubs or small trees growing to 13 m tall, with leaves arranged in opposite pairs.

Species 
Plants of the World Online currently includes: 
 Mesua assamica  (King & Prain) Kosterm. (syn. Kayea assamica)
 Mesua beccariana  (Baill.) Kosterm.
 Mesua calophylloides  (Ridl.) Kosterm.
 Mesua catharinae  (Merr.) Kosterm.
 Mesua clemensiorum  Kosterm.
 Mesua daphnifolia  (Ridl.) Kosterm.
 Mesua elmeri  (Merr.) Kosterm.
 Mesua eugeniifolia  (Pierre) Kosterm.
 Mesua ferrea  L.
 Mesua floribunda  (Wall.) Kosterm.
 Mesua garciae  (Fern.-Vill.) Kosterm.
 Mesua grandis  (King) Kosterm.
 Mesua kochummeniana  Whitmore
 Mesua korthalsiana  (Pierre) Kosterm.
 Mesua lanceolata  (Merr.) Kosterm.
 Mesua larnachiana  (F.Muell.) Kosterm.
 Mesua lepidota  T.Anderson
 Mesua macrantha  (Baill.) Kosterm.
 Mesua macrocarpa  (Pierre) Kosterm.
 Mesua macrophylla  (Kaneh. & Hatus.) Kosterm.
 Mesua manii  (King) Kosterm.
 Mesua megalocarpa  (Merr.) Kosterm.
 Mesua myrtifolia  (Baill.) Kosterm.
 Mesua navesii  (Fern.-Vill.) Kosterm.
 Mesua nervosa  Planch. & Triana
 Mesua nivenii  Whitmore
 Mesua nuda  Kosterm. ex Whitmore
 Mesua oblongifolia  (Ridl.) Kosterm.
 Mesua paludosa  (Kosterm.) Kosterm.
 Mesua paniculata  (Blanco) Kosterm.
 Mesua philippinensis  (Planch. & Triana) Kosterm.
 Mesua planigemma  Kosterm.
 Mesua pulchella  Planch. & Triana
 Mesua purseglovei  Whitmore
 Mesua pustulata  (Ridl.) P.S.Ashton
 Mesua racemosa  (Planch. & Triana) Kosterm.
 Mesua rosea  (Ridl.) Kosterm.
 Mesua stylosa  (Thwaites) Kosterm.
 Mesua sukoeana  (Bor) Kosterm.
 Mesua thwaitesii  Planch. & Triana
 Mesua wrayi  (King) Kosterm.

References

Germplasm Resources Information Network: Mesua
University of Melbourne: Sorting Mesua names

 
Malpighiales genera